The Stolen Bride is a 1913 American drama film starring Harry Carey and Blanche Sweet.

Cast
 Harry Carey as The Husband
 Claire McDowell as The Wife
 Charles West as The Overseer (as Charles H. West)
 Blanche Sweet as The Grower's Daughter
 Harry Hyde as In Posse
 Hector Sarno as In Posse

See also
 Harry Carey filmography
 Blanche Sweet filmography

References

External links

1913 films
American silent short films
Biograph Company films
American black-and-white films
1913 drama films
1913 short films
Films directed by Anthony O'Sullivan
Silent American drama films
1910s American films
American drama short films
1910s English-language films